Đặng Thị Linh Phượng is a Vietnamese powerlifter who has competed for her country at the ASEAN Para Games, and the Summer Paralympics.

Biography
Đặng Thị Linh Phượng was given up to an orphanage by her parents when she was born without legs. She was adopted by her grandmother, and was brought up by her grandmother's housekeeper. Phượng was not sent to school, but was bought school books by her neighbour and was home schooled. After finishing school, she began working for a handicraft company near her home. She took up power lifting at the suggestion of a colleague. Phượng found it initially difficult, but persevered and was selected to compete in her city's disabled sports festival.

Phượng was selected as part of the Vietnamese team for the 2016 Summer Paralympics in Rio de Janeiro, Brazil, in power lifting. As a result of her success, she was awarded 20 million Vietnamese đồng by the Vietnamese Minister for Culture, Sports and Tourism, Nguyễn Ngọc Thiện.

References

Living people
Female powerlifters
Powerlifters at the 2016 Summer Paralympics
Paralympic bronze medalists for Vietnam
Vietnamese powerlifters
Year of birth missing (living people)
Medalists at the 2016 Summer Paralympics
Paralympic medalists in powerlifting
Paralympic powerlifters of Vietnam
21st-century Vietnamese women